Simonopetra Monastery (literally: "Simon's Rock"), also Monastery of Simonos Petra, is an Eastern Orthodox monastery in the monastic state of Mount Athos in Greece. Simonopetra ranks thirteenth in the hierarchy of the Athonite monasteries.

The monastery is located in the southern coast of the Athos peninsula, between the Athonite port of Dafni and Osiou Grigoriou monastery. While the southern coast of Athos is quite rugged in general, the particular site upon which the monastery is built is exceptionally harsh. It is built on top of a single huge rock, practically hanging from a cliff 330 metres over the sea. The monastery currently houses 54 monks, and the hegumen is Archimandrite Eliseus.

History
The monastery was founded  during the 13th century by Simon the Athonite, who was later sanctified by the Eastern Orthodox Church as Saint Simon the Myrrh-bearer. Tradition holds that Simon, while dwelling in a nearby cave, saw a dream in which the Theotokos instructed him to build a monastery on top of the rock, promising him that she would protect and provide for him and the monastery. The original monastery was called by Simon "New Bethlehem" (Greek: Νέα Βηθλεέμ) and is to this day dedicated to the Nativity of Jesus.

In 1364, the Serbian despot Jovan Uglješa funded the renovation and expansion of the monastery. He issued a royal chrysobull for the monastery in 1368.

Russian pilgrim Isaiah wrote that, by the end of the 15th century, the monastery was Bulgarian.

In 1567, the arsanas (port building) of Simonopetra was completed. Its construction was funded by a Wallachian noble.

In 1581, Simonopetra was destroyed by a fire, in which a large portion of the monks died. Evgenios, the monastery's abbot traveled to the Danubian Principalities hoping to raise funds to rebuild the monastery. The most important donor was Michael the Brave, Prince of Wallachia, who donated large portions of land as well as money to the monastery. The monastery was also burnt in 1626, and the last great fire happened in 1891, after which the monastery was rebuilt to its current form.

During recent centuries, the monks of the monastery were traditionally from Ionia in Asia Minor. However, during the mid-20th century the brotherhood was greatly thinned out because of a great reduction in the influx of new monks. The current brotherhood originates from the Holy Monastery of Great Meteoron in Meteora, when in 1973  (also known as Aimilianos of Simonopetra) and his monks moved into Simonopetra, hence repopulating the almost abandoned monastery. He served as Abbot of Simonopetra from 1974 until 2000.

20th-century saints associated with the monastery include  (died 1957).

Architecture
The monastery consists of several multi-storeyed buildings, the main being in the place of the original structure, built by Simon. The main building has been described as the "most bold construction of the peninsula". The monks of Simonopetra traditionally count the floors from top to bottom, thus the top floor is the first floor and the bottom floor the last. The monastery is built on top of the underlying massive rock, and the rock runs through the lower floors.

The expansion and development of Simon's original structure almost always followed one of the monastery's great fires. Following the 1580 fire and with the funds gathered by abbot Evgenios, the western building was erected. The eastern building was built following the 1891 fire mostly with funds raised in Russia.

Choir
The choir of Simonopetra has grown in reputation among Byzantine music specialists and enthusiasts. The monastery has published a series of collections of ecclesiastic Byzantine chants by the choir. Of these, Agni Parthene is the most popular and has earned the choir and the monastery widespread recognition.

Recordings include:

 Hymns from the Psalter (1990)
 O Pure Virgin (Agni Parthene) (1990)
 Divine Liturgy (1999)
 Great Vespers (1999)
 Paraklesis (1999)
 Service of Saint Simon (1999)
 Sunday Matins (Orthros) (1999)
 Service of St. Silouan the Athonite (2004)

Gallery

References

External links

 Simonopetra monastery at the Mount Athos website (Internet Archive)
 Liturgica.com: the recordings of the choir of Simonopetra
 Youtube: The recordings of the Choir of Simonopetra
 History of monastery (grec.)
 Choir of Simonopetra (Χορός Σιμωνόπετρας), album recordings on YouTube

 
Monasteries on Mount Athos
Greek Orthodox monasteries in Greece
Byzantine sacred architecture
Christian monasteries established in the 13th century
Byzantine monasteries in Greece